Jalal Donnell Leach (born March 14, 1969), is an American former Major League Baseball player who played for the San Francisco Giants in . He was primarily used as a pinch hitter, but was also used as an outfielder.

Career
Born in San Francisco, Leach attended Pepperdine University. In 1989, he played collegiate summer baseball with the Wareham Gatemen of the Cape Cod Baseball League and was named a league all-star.

Signed originally by the New York Yankees after being selected in the seventh round of the 1990 Major League Baseball Draft, Leach played for six big-league organizations during his career in organized baseball. In 12 plate appearances during his September 2001 trail with the Giants, he collected two bases on balls and one hit, a single off Octavio Dotel of the Houston Astros on September 19.

After his playing career, Leach became a scout, working for the Yankees until he returned to the Giants in that role for the  season.

References

External links

Pelota Binaria (Venezuelan Winter League)

1969 births
Living people
Acereros de Monclova players
African-American baseball players
Águilas del Zulia players
Albany-Colonie Yankees players
American expatriate baseball players in Canada
American expatriate baseball players in Mexico
Baseball players from San Francisco
Cardenales de Lara players
American expatriate baseball players in Venezuela
Columbus Clippers players
Fargo-Moorhead RedHawks players
Fort Lauderdale Yankees players
Fresno Grizzlies players
Harrisburg Senators players
Leones de Yucatán players
Major League Baseball outfielders
Mexican League baseball center fielders
Mexican League baseball left fielders
New York Yankees scouts
Oneonta Yankees players
Ottawa Lynx players
People from Novato, California
Pepperdine Waves baseball players
Prince William Cannons players
San Francisco Giants players
San Francisco Giants scouts
Saraperos de Saltillo players
Scranton/Wilkes-Barre Red Barons players
Shreveport Captains players
Tacoma Rainiers players
Tigres de Aragua players
Wareham Gatemen players
Winnipeg Goldeyes players
American expatriate baseball players in Australia
Brisbane Bandits players
21st-century African-American people
20th-century African-American sportspeople